Saxe-Gotha was one of the Saxon duchies held by the Ernestine branch of the Wettin dynasty in the former Landgraviate of Thuringia. The ducal residence was erected at Gotha.

History

The duchy was established in 1640, when Duke Wilhelm von Saxe-Weimar created a subdivision for his younger brother 
Ernest I the Pious. Duke Ernest took his residence at Gotha, where he had Schloss Friedenstein built between 1643 and 1654. At the same time, the Duchy of Saxe-Eisenach was created for the third brother Albert IV.

Nevertheless, Albert died in 1644, and Ernest inherited large parts of his duchy, though not the core territory around the residence at Eisenach and the Wartburg, which fell to his elder brother Wilhelm of Saxe-Weimar. Ernest could also incorporate several remaining estates of the extinct House of Henneberg in 1660, which had been vacant since 1583. Finally in 1672 he received the major part of Saxe-Altenburg through his wife Elisabeth Sophie, after Altenburg's last duke Frederick William III had died without heirs. Ernest would then be called Duke of Saxe-Gotha-Altenburg.

When Ernest died in 1675, he left his seven sons a significantly enlarged territory. The eldest, Frederick I at first ruled jointly with his brothers until in 1680 the duchy was divided. The area around Gotha and also Altenburg passed to Frederick I, who retained the title of a Duke of Saxe-Gotha-Altenburg.  For later history of the duchy, see Saxe-Gotha-Altenburg.

Dukes of Saxe-Gotha 
 Ernest I the Pious (1640–75), Duke of Saxe-Gotha-Altenburg from 1672
 Frederick I, Duke of Saxe-Gotha-Altenburg (1675–1691), jointly with his brothers until 1680:
 Albert V, became Duke of Saxe-Coburg
 Bernhard I, became Duke of Saxe-Meiningen
 Heinrich, became Duke of Saxe-Römhild 
 Christian, became Duke of Saxe-Eisenberg
 Ernest, became Duke of Saxe-Hildburghausen
 John Ernest IV, became Duke of Saxe-Saalfeld

When the house of Saxe-Gotha and Altenburg became extinct in 1825, Saxe-Gotha-Altenburg was split. Saxe-Gotha passed to the Duke of Saxe-Coburg-Saalfeld who in turn gave Saalfeld to Saxe-Meiningen. The Duke of Saxe-Hildburghausen received Saxe-Altenburg, and gave the district of Hildburghausen to Saxe-Meiningen.

After the abolition of German monarchies at the end of the First World War it became a part of the newly created state of Thuringia in 1920.

References
 Saxe-Gotha, Columbia Encyclopedia, Sixth Edition, Columbia University Press (2001–05), accessed January 27, 2007

1640 establishments in the Holy Roman Empire
1680 disestablishments in the Holy Roman Empire
States and territories established in 1640
Gotha
 
House of Wettin
Gotha